"You Won't Be Lonely Now" is a song written by Brett James and John Bettis, and recorded by American country music singer Billy Ray Cyrus.  It was released in May 2000 as the first single from the album Southern Rain.  The power ballad debuted at number 62 on the Hot Country Singles & Tracks (now Hot Country Songs chart) on July 8, 2000.  It was the first of five singles released from the album, as well as the highest-charting single, peaking in the Top 20.

"You Won't Be Lonely Now" was Cyrus' last Top 40 country hit until 2007, when "Ready, Set, Don't Go" reached number 4.

Critical reception
William Ruhlmann of Allmusic said that the song "properly displayed the artist's sense of determination against adversity, cloaked in the terms of a love song."

Music video
The music video was directed by Jim Shea and premiered in June 2000.

Chart performance

Year-end charts

Notes

Musician credits

 Drums: Chris McHugh
 Bass Guitar: Mike Brignardello
 Acoustic Guitar: Dann Huff, Gordon Kennedy
 Electric Guitar: Dann Huff, Gordon Kennedy
 Steel Guitar: Paul Franklin
 Keyboards: Tim Akers, Steve Nathan
 Percussion: Eric Darken
 Background Vocals: Gene Miller, Vicki Hampton, Lisa Cochran

References

2000 singles
2000 songs
Billy Ray Cyrus songs
Songs written by Brett James
Songs with lyrics by John Bettis
Song recordings produced by Dann Huff
Monument Records singles